Anastrepha fenestrata is a species of tephritid or fruit flies in the genus Anastrepha.

References

Trypetinae
Insects described in 1918